Eugen Ott (8 April 1889 – 22 January 1977) was the German ambassador to Japan during the early years of World War II who was notably deceived and compromised by Soviet spy Richard Sorge.

Early career
During World War I, Ott served with distinction on the Eastern Front as an officer with the 26th (Württemberg) Infantry Division. His commander was General Wilhelm von Urach, who was elected king of Lithuania in 1918 as Mindaugas II of Lithuania.

Before Adolf Hitler came to power in Germany (1933), Ott had been the adjutant of General Kurt von Schleicher.

In Japan
In 1934, he was sent to Tokyo as military attaché at the German embassy.

In early September 1940, Heinrich Georg Stahmer arrived in Tokyo to assist Ott in negotiating the Tripartite Pact with Japan. Stahmer later replaced Ott as ambassador when Richard Sorge, who had been working for Ott in Japan as an agent for the Abwehr, was unmasked as a Soviet spy in Japan in late 1941.

Prange suggests in his analysis of Sorge that Sorge was so entirely trusted by Ott that he was allowed access to top secret cables from Berlin in the embassy. That trust was the main foundation for Sorge's success as a Red Army spy.

Later career
Ott left Tokyo and went to Peking, China, for the rest of the war.

See also
German-Japanese relations

References
Prange, Gordon W. (1984). Target Tokyo. New York: McGraw Hill. .

External links
 

1889 births
1977 deaths
Major generals of the German Army (Wehrmacht)
German Army personnel of World War I
German people of World War II
People from the Kingdom of Württemberg
Ambassadors of Germany to Japan